Major General James Scott-Elliot,  (6 November 1902 – 12 September 1996) was a senior British Army officer.

Military career
Educated at Wellington College, Berkshire, and the Royal Military College, Sandhurst, Scott-Elliot was commissioned into the King's Own Scottish Borderers on 1 February 1923. He transferred to the Argyll and Sutherland Highlanders in 1935 and attended the Staff College, Camberley from 1937 to 1938. After this, he served as a General Staff Officer Grade 3 (GSO3) with Scottish Command.

Scott-Elliot was deployed to France with the British Expeditionary Force (BEF) at the start of the Second World War as a brigade major with the 51st (Highland) Division's 154th Infantry Brigade. After being evacuated from France in June 1940, he became commanding officer of the 6th Battalion, Argyll and Sutherland Highlanders in April 1942 and landed with his battalion in North Africa after Operation Torch in December 1942. He went on to serve as commander of the 17th Indian Infantry Brigade and then as commander of the 167th (1st London) Brigade in Italy during the Italian campaign. His brigade was the first unit to cross the River Po on the route north through Italy.

After the war, Scott-Elliot commanded the 13th Infantry Brigade during most of 1947 before becoming Deputy Director of Military Training at the War Office in 1948, Deputy Commander of the 51st (Highland) Division in 1950 and then General Officer Commanding the 51st (Highland) Division in November 1952. He retired from the army in March 1956.

Scott-Elliot served as colonel of the King's Own Scottish Borderers from 1954 to 1961, and as Lord Lieutenant of Dumfries from 1962 to 1967.

Family
In 1932 Scott-Elliot married Cecil Margaret Du Buisson; they had one son and two daughters. After being divorced from his first wife, he married Fay Courtauld in 1971.

Works

References

External links
Generals of World War II

|-

|-

1902 births
1996 deaths
Argyll and Sutherland Highlanders officers
Graduates of the Staff College, Camberley
British Army major generals
King's Own Scottish Borderers officers
Companions of the Order of the Bath
Commanders of the Order of the British Empire
Companions of the Distinguished Service Order
People educated at Wellington College, Berkshire
Lord-Lieutenants of Dumfries
Military personnel from London
British Army brigadiers of World War II
Graduates of the Royal Military College, Sandhurst
People from Charlton, London